Wise Feed Company Building, also known as the Motor Mart Garage Building, is a historic commercial building located at Springfield, Greene County, Missouri. It was built about 1930, and is a two-story, rectangular tan brick commercial building.  It has a flat roof and rests on a concrete foundation.  It features decorative brickwork on the front facade.

It was listed on the National Register of Historic Places in 2002.

References

Commercial buildings on the National Register of Historic Places in Missouri
Commercial buildings completed in 1930
Buildings and structures in Springfield, Missouri
National Register of Historic Places in Greene County, Missouri